Uncanny is the fourth in a series of collections of short stories by Australian author Paul Jennings. It was first released in 1988.

The stories

On the Bottom
When a boy goes fishing with his father, he finds a severed finger with a bear tattoo on it. This tattoo comes to life and directs the boy to its former owner, who is covered with tattoos; all of those tattoos then come to life and attach themselves to the boy.

A Good Tip for Ghosts
When twin brothers move to a new school, the bully forces them to go to a haunted garbage tip at night after making them touch a pair of false teeth, or they will be beaten up until they pass the test. But in the end, the ghost who haunts the garbage trip reveals he has been looking for the false teeth. Then, the bully then becomes the victim of the test, as a ghost haunts him as a request from the brothers. Was later adapted as an episode of Round The Twist.

Frozen Stiff
An old man makes a living by collecting dead animals and freezing them in his ice factory. A man keeps a cow locked in his shed, and a boy tries to get it back to the countryside. Was originally going to be adapted as a Round the Twist episode, but was scrapped for cost reasons and concerns over animal cruelty.

UFD
A boy reports seeing a UFO (in actuality a flying dog), but his family does not believe him. He bets his father a thousand dollars if he can prove he saw one, or three years of washing dishes if he can't.

Cracking Up
A boy gets many punishments from his angry teacher, the worst of which is having to look after the teacher's pot plant for a night. However, the worst part is that two people died in his bedroom at his new house; the spirit of one of them tickles him, causing him to break the pot plant, then the next day at school, the spirit follows him around; as he is the only one that can see it, he gets in trouble for things that it does.

Greensleeves
A poor man makes a living by blowing up tree stumps and selling the wood chips as firewood. But when a whale washes ashore, dies, and causes problems for the town, this man is promised a lot of money if he can get rid of it.

Mousechap
A boy stays at his aunt and uncle's house. His uncle has started acting like a mouse, so he is locked in the basement. His aunt explains that the uncle had previously invented a machine that acts as a mousetrap, but instead of killing the mouse, it causes it to run away. Similarly, a mouse that has been hiding in the boy's room acts like a person; the boy later finds out that if two animals touch the machine at the same time, their brains get switched.

Spaghetti Pig-out
A boy is always lonely at school because the school bully never lets anyone associate with him. He is pretty much lonely at home as well because of his lack of technology. But one day, he gets a strange video player whose remote control also works on people. However, the bully eventually steals the remote. Back at school, they both enter a spaghetti-eating contest in which the winner earns a free holiday. The bully, due to eating too much spaghetti via the fast forward function on the remote, throws up and is disqualified from the contest, allowing the boy to win the holiday. Was later adapted as an episode of Round The Twist.

Know All
A family finds a chest of old circus outfits that cause whoever wears them to gain the abilities of their original owner. The family's scarecrow also gains abilities from being dressed in one of the outfits, however the original owner of this outfit was not a very nice person. Was later adapted as an episode of Round The Twist.

External links
 The book on Paul Jennings' site

Australian short story collections
1988 short story collections
Books by Paul Jennings (Australian author)
Australian children's books
1988 children's books
Puffin Books books